The Shvetsov ASh-2 was a 28-cylinder, air-cooled, radial aircraft engine designed in the Soviet Union in the late 1940s. It was inferior to the Dobrynin VD-4K engine and did not enter production. One of the problems was air-cooling which ate up to 50% of the total engine power at 15000 meters. In contrast, the liquid-cooled VD-4K required only 5% of power for cooling at the same altitude.

Specifications (ASh-2)

See also

References

Notes

Bibliography

 

1940s aircraft piston engines
Aircraft air-cooled radial piston engines
Shvetsov aircraft engines